Sayyid Mubarak Baihaqi (Persian: سيد مبارک بیهقی) was the 33rd Sultan of Kashmir as he ascended the throne in February 1579 replacing Yousuf Shah Chak. He was dethroned in November 1579 by Lohar Khan Chak, restoring the Chak dynasty in the monarchy of Kashmir. He also served Ali Shah Chak as his Wazīr which was, after the Sultan, the highest civil office in the Kashmiri government. Sayyid belonged to the Baihaqi family which settled in Kashmir after migrating from Baihaq.

References 

Rulers of Kashmir
Sultans of Kashmir